City of London Investment Trust is a large British investment trust dedicated to investments in UK equities. Established in 1861, the company is a constituent of the FTSE 250 Index; it is also listed on the New Zealand Stock Exchange. The chairman is Sir Laurie Magnus, and the manager since 1991 has been Job Curtis. The fund is managed by Janus Henderson.

History
The company was formed as City of London Brewery Company Limited in 1860 to acquire Calverts, a family brewing business at Upper Thames Street in the City of London. In 1932, the name was changed to The City of London Brewery and Investment Trust Limited, parts of the business having been sold and the proceeds invested in securities according to investment trust principles. In 1968, the remaining part of the brewery business was sold and the Company concentrated exclusively on investments in securities.

In 1970, the Company appointed Touche Remnant as Investment Manager and in 1982 the name was changed to TR City of London Trust PLC. In 1992, Touche, Remnant & Co. was acquired by Henderson Administration Group plc. The name of the company was changed to The City of London Investment Trust plc in October 1997.

References

External links
 Official site

Investment trusts of the United Kingdom
Financial services companies established in 1861
1861 establishments in England
Companies listed on the London Stock Exchange